Wyliea is a genus of robber flies in the family Asilidae.

Species
The following species are recognised in the genus Wyliea:
 Wyliea chrysauges (Osten Sacken, 1887)
 Wyliea mydas (Brauer, 1885)

References

Further reading

 
 
 

Asilidae
Articles created by Qbugbot
Asilidae genera